Louis Ambroise Marie Pauly (4 April 1906 – 14 December 1992) was a sailor from France, who represented his country at the 1928 Summer Olympics in Amsterdam, Netherlands.

References 

 

1906 births
1992 deaths
Sailors at the 1928 Summer Olympics – 12' Dinghy
Olympic sailors of France
French male sailors (sport)